Tropical Storm Dalila caused flooding in western Mexico in late July 2007. The seventh tropical cyclone and the fourth named storm of the 2007 Pacific hurricane season, Dalila developed from a tropical wave located well southwest of Mexico on July 22. Initially, northeasterly shear caused the depression to remain disorganized, though by early on July 24, it was upgraded to Tropical Storm Dalila. During the next twenty-four hours, Dalila strengthened slightly further while tracking steadily northwestward, attaining peak winds of  early on the following day. Shortly thereafter, Dalila either crossed or moved very close to Socorro Island on July 25. Due to decreasing sea surface temperatures, the storm slowly began to weaken, after curving west-northwestward. Early on July 27, Dalila was downgraded to a tropical depression, several hours before degenerating into a remnant low pressure area.

Despite its close passage to Socorro Island near peak intensity, no impact was reported. Additionally, 50 homes were destroyed, leaving approximately 200 people homeless. Eleven fatalities were confirmed, all of them occurred in Jalisco, most of which from drowning. Portions of Baja California Sur also experienced heavy rains from Dalila and its remnants, though no flooding was reported.

Meteorological history

A tropical wave entered the eastern Pacific Ocean on July 17. Two days later, the wave spawned a low pressure area while located several hundred miles south-southeast of the Gulf of Tehuantepec. The National Hurricane Center began issuing Tropical Weather Outlooks (TWOs) and initially noting that slow development was possible within the next 48 hours. Convective activity increased and Dvorak satellite classifications began early on July 21. Another TWO issued later that day indicated that the circulation was becoming better-defined. A strong upper-level high pressure area generated moderate shear, though the National Hurricane Center noted that it would not interfere with intensification. However, the depression initially failed to strengthen significantly. It remained disorganized, with the circulation elongated northeastward to southwestward and deep convection displaced to the west. Early on July 23, a burst of deep convection occurred southwest of the center of circulation, while satellite imagery indicated that development of banding features.

Finally, the depression strengthened into Tropical Storm Dalila by 0000 UTC on July 24. Due to an anticipated decrease in wind shear, Dalila was again predicted to peak with winds of  early on July 26. Shortly thereafter, it passed over or very close to Socorro Island. Later on July 25, Dalila curved west-northwestward and began entering a region of colder sea surface temperatures, resulting in weakening as the cloud pattern became less organized. Due to the quick deterioration of the storm, the National Hurricane Center noted that, "Dalila is winding down faster than anticipated". Early on July 27, it weakened to a tropical depression. Later that day, the storm became devoid of deep convection for over 12 hours. The remnant low moved west-northwestward during the next few days and then curved west-southwestward on July 29.

Impact and aftermath
Because the storm remained well away from the mainland of Mexico, no tropical cyclone warnings and watches were issued. However, the Civil Defense authorities in Mexico posted a "blue alert" for the states of Baja California Sur, Colima, Jalisco, Michoacán, and Nayarit on July 23. Simultaneously, a "green alert" was issued for Colima, Jalisco, and Michoacán.  Rainfall in excess of  fell in parts of western Mexico on July 22. The heavy rains triggered flooding in Jalisco that killed 11 people. Three people drowned in a van after driving into a flooded road, while a fourth fatality occurred after another car was swept away into a river. The fifth fatality also resulted from drowning near a hydroelectric plant. Four people were killed after a train derailed on a flooded track. Five other people were injured by the crash, two of which were critically injured. Flood waters up to  covered numerous roads, stranding 45 vehicles and resulting in 75 accidents, which caused at least 25 injuries. About 50 homes were destroyed by the storm in Jalisco, leaving approximately 200 people homeless.

City officials reported that 10 neighborhoods were flooded. In rural areas of Michoacán, a combination of heavy rains and hail destroyed about 40 homes. Offshore the city of Acapulco in Guerrero, several waterspouts were spawned. As the storm weakened, it produced rough seas and heavy rains over parts of Baja California Sur. Following the storm, the Government of Mexico supplied the affected residents with special care, blankets, and cardboard sheets.

See also

 Other tropical cyclones of the same name
 Timeline of the 2007 Pacific hurricane season

Notes

References

External links
Eastern North Pacific Hurricane Season of 2007

Tropical Storm Dalila Advisory Archive

2007 Pacific hurricane season
Eastern Pacific tropical storms
Pacific hurricanes in Mexico
Tropical Storm Dalila
Dalila